Franklin Lewis Dershem (March 5, 1865 – February 14, 1950) was a Democratic member of the U.S. House of Representatives from Pennsylvania.

Biography
Franklin L. Dershem was born near New Columbia, Pennsylvania.  He graduated from Palm’s National Business College at Philadelphia in 1887.  He was appointed postmaster at Kelly Point, Pennsylvania, on March 9, 1888, and served until January 13, 1891.  He was engaged in agricultural pursuits, and was also interested in the hardware business from 1891 to 1913.  He was a member of the board of trustees of Albright College in Myerstown, Pennsylvania.  He was a member of the Pennsylvania State House of Representatives in 1907, 1908, and again in 1911 and 1912.

Dershem was elected as a Democrat to the Sixty-third Congress.  He was an unsuccessful candidate for reelection in 1914 .  He was appointed as an auditor in the Philadelphia division of the United States Bureau of Internal Revenue, serving from October 1, 1915, until March 31, 1935.  He was engaged as an auditor and income-tax specialist in Lewisburg, Pennsylvania, where he died February 14, 1950.  Interment in Lewisburg Cemetery.

Sources

The Political Graveyard

1865 births
1950 deaths
Democratic Party members of the United States House of Representatives from Pennsylvania
Democratic Party members of the Pennsylvania House of Representatives